Pirlta is a locality situated in the Sunraysia region in Australia. The place by road, is situated about 8 kilometres west from Benetook and 7 kilometres east from Merrinee.
The Post Office opened on 14 August 1924 (closing in 1964).

Notes and references

 

 

Towns in Victoria (Australia)